The 2001–02 season was the 86th season in the existence of RCD Mallorca and the club's fifth consecutive season in the top flight of Spanish football. In addition to the domestic league, Mallorca participated in this season's editions of the Copa del Rey, the UEFA Champions League and the UEFA Cup.

Transfers

In

Out

Competitions

Overall record

La Liga

League table

Results by round

Matches

Copa del Rey

UEFA Champions League

Third qualifying round

First group stage

UEFA Cup

Third round

References 

RCD Mallorca seasons
RCD Mallorca